The 192nd Pennsylvania House of Representatives District is located in Philadelphia County and includes the following areas:

 Ward 04 [PART, Divisions 02, 03, 04, 05, 06, 09, 10, 11, 14, 15, 16, 17, 18 and 21]
 Ward 34
 Ward 52 [PART, Divisions 05, 14, 15, 16, 17, 18, 19, 20, 22, 23, 24, 25, 26 and 27]

Representatives

References

Government of Philadelphia
192